Michelle Bonello (born March 10, 1985) is a women's ice hockey player who has also competed for the Canada women's national inline hockey team, having participated at seven FIRS Inline Hockey World Championships With regards to Bonello's women's ice hockey career, she has competed at the university level with the Mercyhurst Lakers women's ice hockey program in the NCAA. Acquired by the Toronto Furies in the 2010 CWHL Draft, the first in league history, she would capture the Clarkson Cup in 2014.

Playing career

Ice hockey
Bonello joined the Mercyhurst Lakers in 2003. As a freshman, she played in all 36 games. In her freshman year, she had five goals and 12 assists for 17 points. Her four power play goals tied for first on the Lakers. On October 25, 2003, Bonello had her only multiple-goal game came of the season in a contest against St. Lawrence. In the CHA semi-finals, she notched the game-winning goal versus Wayne State. The following season, she played in 37 games and accumulated 17 points while being named to the CHA All-Conference First Team.

A member of the Toronto Furies in their inaugural season, Bonello would play in their first two seasons. After being inactive for 2012-13, Bonello returned for the 2013-14 campaign, which culminated with a Clarkson Cup victory. In the autumn of 2014, Bonello was named captain of the Furies. She also holds the rare distinction of having played in both the first and second CWHL All-Star Games. Both Games were contested at Toronto's Air Canada Centre.

Inline hockey

Bonello made her debut for the Canadian national team at the 2006 FIRS Women's World Championships, emerging with a silver medal. Of note, three of her teammates on the roster had also played with her at Mercyhurst; Meghan Agosta, Teresa Marchese and Samantha Shirley. 

At the 2009 FIRS Worlds, Bonello enjoyed some stellar performances. Contributing two goals and an assist, Bonello placed her name on the scoresheet during a 13-2 defeat of Australia. Challenging Finland on Canada Day 2009, Bonello contributed a three point performance (one goal, two assists) in a 15-3 triumph. 

Bonello was part of the gold medal roster at the 2012 World Championships, hosted in Bucaramanga, Colombia. With the squad enjoying a 6-0 record, former Mercyhurst Lakers teammate Jackie Jarrell, plus Toronto Furies teammate Kendra Fisher, played for the Canadian contingent. 

Among the veteran players that helped Canada win the gold medal at the 2016 FIRS Inline Hockey World Championship, Bonello enjoyed her seventh podium finish and the second gold medal in her career. Bonello would finish the tournament as one of Canada's five leading scorers. As a side note, Furies teammate Alyssa Baldin was also part of the Canadian gold medal winning roster.

Career stats

NCAA

CWHL

FIRS Worlds

Awards and honours
CHA All-Rookie Team (2003–04) 
CHA All-Tournament Team (2003–04) 
All-CHA First Team (2004–05) 
All-CHA Second Team (2006–07)
2009-10 CWHL First Team All-Star
2014 Clarkson Cup

References

Clarkson Cup champions
1985 births
Living people
Canadian women's ice hockey defencemen
Canadian women's national inline hockey team players
Ice hockey people from Ontario
Mercyhurst Lakers women's ice hockey players
Sportspeople from Mississauga
Toronto Furies players